Melicytus lanceolatus, commonly called narrow-leaved māhoe or māhoe-wao, is a small tree of the family Violaceae endemic to New Zealand.

Narrow-leaved māhoe is a slender shrub or small tree with long, thin leaves that have a serrated edge. Its flowers are yellow, but can be red/brown, and are followed by a purple fruit.

It is a host species for the caterpillars of the New Zealand endemic moth Austramathes purpurea.

References

lanceolatus
Trees of New Zealand
Dioecious plants